Vanagamudi is a 1957 Indian Tamil-language film starring Sivaji Ganesan and Savitri. The film directed by P. Pullaiah, was released on 12 April 1957. The film was a super hit at the box office.

Plot

Cast 

Male cast
 Sivaji Ganesan as Architect Chitrasenan
 M. K. Radha as King
 V. Nagayya as Sevappan
 M. N. Nambiar as Narendran
 K. A. Thangavelu as Paranjothi
Male support cast
 M. R. Santhanam, Nat Annaji Rao,Thangappan and Gemini Balu.

Female cast
Savitri as Devasundari
Kannamba as Mangalam
Rajasulochana as Ambika
M. Saroja as Neelaveni
Dance
 Helen

Soundtrack 
The music was composed by G. Ramanathan, and the lyrics by Thanjai N. Ramaiah Dass. The song "Ennai Pol Penn" is set in Todi raga, and "Vaa Vaa Valarmathiye" is set in Suddhadhanyasi.

Release and reception 
Vanangamudi was released on 12 April 1957. During the time of its release, Mohan Arts handcrafted an  cutout which was kept at the Chennai-based Chitra theatre. According to Mohan Arts founder K. Mohan's son Harinath, it was the tallest standee made in the whole of Asia at that time. On 19 April 1957, The Indian Express positively reviewed the film, particularly Ganesan's performance. The film emerged a commercial success.

References

External links 

1950s Tamil-language films
1957 films
Films directed by P. Pullayya
Films scored by G. Ramanathan
Indian epic films